World Human Rights Protection Commissions (WHRPC) is an Indian nonprofit organization dedicated to the implementation of the universal declaration of human rights. The organization was founded in 2017.

Mission 
World Human Rights Protection Commissions, India has been established by an Act of Parliament under the Protection of Human Rights Act, 1882 for the protection and promotion of human rights.
In addition to the functions of the Commission set forth in Section 12 of the Act and the investigation into complaints of violation of human rights by a public servant or negligence in the prevention of such violations, the Commission also studies treaties and international instruments on human rights and advises the Government on their recommendations for effective implementation.

References 

Human rights organisations based in India